Ek Packet Umeed is a weekly show that aired on NDTV Imagine.

Plot
The story focuses on Ambika Dharamraj and 15 other members who have all chosen to make a change. Despite having undergone so much misery they now live a happy life in a home they can call their own and with a family of their choice! With a never-say-die attitude, each of the characters have taken it upon themselves to bring joy and happiness through the packets of food like masalas, aachar, papads, jams that they make and sell every day.

End
While the show was anticipated to make significant progress, the storyline failed to captivate the attention of the audience and was ultimately terminated after airing 33 episodes. The producers blamed the timing and dynamics of the show, as the show was aired only once a week, which with the fleeting memory of the audience and the available competition of other shows, prevented Ek Packet Umeed from being successful.

Characters

Guests
 Sidharth Shukla (2008)
 Rajesh Kumar (actor) as Gudiya's Groom(2008)

Awards

The Indian Telly Awards 
Best Weekly Programme - Winner (2008)

2008 Indian television series debuts
Imagine TV original programming
2009 Indian television series endings
Hats Off Productions